From Two to Six is a 1918 American silent comedy drama film directed by Albert Parker and starring Winifred Allen, Earle Foxe and Forrest Robinson.

Cast
Winifred Allen as 	Alice Stevens
 Earle Foxe as 	Howard Skeele
 Forrest Robinson as 	John Stevens
 Robert Fischer as 	Baron Kuno Von Wiederholtz
 Margaret Greene as 	Madame Elsa
 Clarence Handyside as 	Richard Skeele
 Charles Wells as George Worth 
 Madeline Marshall as 	Margaret Worth
 Amy Somers as 	French Maid
 Riley Hatch as 	House Detective

References

Bibliography
 Connelly, Robert B. The Silents: Silent Feature Films, 1910-36, Volume 40, Issue 2. December Press, 1998.

External links
 

1910s American films
1918 films
1918 comedy films
1910s English-language films
American silent feature films
Silent American comedy films
American black-and-white films
Films directed by Albert Parker
Triangle Film Corporation films